Tiger is a surname. Notable people with the name include:

 Dana Tiger (born 1961), Muscogee/Seminole/Cherokee artist
 Dick Tiger (1929–1971), Nigerian boxer
 Jerome Tiger (1941–1967), Seminole/Muscogee artist
 Johnny Tiger Jr. (born 1940), Seminole/Muscogee artist
 Lionel Tiger (born 1937), anthropologist
 Peggy Tiger (1943–2017), Cherokee author
 Yuriko Tiger or Eleonora Aureliana Guglielmi (born 1993), Italian cosplay celebrity

See also 
 Tiger (nickname)
 Big Tiger, Principal Chief of the council of a dissident group of Cherokee (1824–1828)
 Buffalo Tiger (1920–2015), leader of the Miccosukee Tribe in Florida

Native American surnames